The 35th Edition Vuelta a España (Tour of Spain), a long-distance bicycle stage race and one of the three grand tours, was held from 22 April to 11 May 1980.

Roberto Visentini won the prologue of the race and kept the leader's jersey for the first five days of the race. Sean Kelly finished second in the prologue and won the next two stages but did not get to wear the leader's jersey. On the first mountain stage, Faustino Rupérez came solo to the finish and took the leader's jersey which he kept until the end of the race. Pedro Torres put in an attack on the penultimate stage on the climb to Puerto de la Morcuera. However Rupérez together with Miguel Mari Lasa bridged up to Torres half way to Alto de Cotos and the leader's jersey was safe. Rupérez won the race ahead of Torres and Claude Criquielion. Criquielion's Splendor teammate Kelly won five stages of the race, the points jersey and finished fourth overall. Marino Lejarreta finished the race fifth overall. Juan Fernández won the Mountains competition.

Teams and riders

Route

Results

Final General Classification

References

 
1980 in road cycling
1980
1980 in Spanish sport
April 1980 sports events in Europe
May 1980 sports events in Europe
1980 Super Prestige Pernod